Gauharshad (before 1479 – after 1546), was a Kazan princess. She was the regent of the Kazan Khanate between 1531 and 1533 during the minority of Canghali of Kazan. 

She was the daughter of Ibrahim of Kazan and Nur Sultan. She married Qasim khan Shayex Allahiar (Şäyex Allahiär) (r. 1512-1515). In 1531, she managed to put her son on the Kazan throne with the support of Moscow and the local elite. Since her son was a minor, he was placed under a regency under her presidency.

References

Khanate of Kazan
16th-century women rulers